Gibson Lake is an endorheic lake in the community of Palgrave, part of the town of Caledon, Regional Municipality of Peel in the Greater Toronto Area of Ontario, Canada.

References

Other map sources:

Lakes of the Regional Municipality of Peel